Crocanthemum dumosum, common names bushy frostweed and bushy rockrose, is a perennial plant that is native to the United States.

Conservation status
It is listed as endangered in Rhode Island, threatened in New York, a species of special concern in Massachusetts.  It is listed as a species of special concern and believed extirpated in Connecticut.

References

Flora of the United States
Cistaceae